Kikerinsky Rural Settlement is a rural settlement in the Volosovsky District of the Leningrad Oblast. Kikerino is the administrative centre.

The head of the administration is Kostanyan Igor Razmikovich.

References

Rural localities in Leningrad Oblast